The sixth series of Ex on the Beach, a British television programme, began on 17 January 2017 on MTV. The series was confirmed on 2 November 2016. The group of cast members for this series included Geordie Shore star Aaron Chalmers, former The Only Way Is Essex star Nicole Bass and Love Island series 1 contestant Josh Ritchie. It also featured the return of Ross Worswick following his appearance in the first series of the show.

Shortly after the series it was announced that Zahida Allen had joined the cast of Geordie Shore for the fourteenth series. Josh later returned for the seventh series, this time as an ex. Chanelle McCleary also went on to compete in the eighteenth series of Big Brother, but was evicted a week before the final.

Cast
The official list of cast members were released on 13 December 2016. They included four boys; Alex Leslie, Josh Ritchie, Ross Worswick and Sean Pratt, and four girls: Harriette Harper, Maisie Gillespie, Zahida Allen and ZaraLena Jackson. Ross has previously appeared in the first series of the show whereas Josh featured in the first series of Love Island. With the announcement of the line-up it was also confirmed that Geordie Shore star Aaron Chalmers would be arriving on the beach as an ex as well as former The Only Way Is Essex cast member Nicole Bass. 

All original cast members arrived at the beach during the first episode and were immediately told to prepare for the arrival of their exes. The first episode also included Zahida's ex-boyfriend Joe McLean arrive on the beach hell-bent on revenge against her, and The Only Way Is Essex star Nicole Bass show up as Josh's ex-fling. Jack Devlin made his debut during the second episode determined to rekindle the relationship with his ex-girlfriend Harriette. He is also Nicole's ex. This episode also featured the shock arrival of Alex's ex-girlfriend Alice Downer who showed up at the villa with no warning. The third episode featured the arrival of Geordie Shore cast member Aaron Chalmers, who arrived at the villa in a helicopter to surprise his ex-one night stand Maisie. The Tablet of Terror also gave Josh the power to send one of his housemates home during this episode, and he chose Alex. Another ex of Nicole's is unearthed during the fourth episode as Adam Oukhellou turns up with the clear intention to cause trouble. During the fifth episode Aaron's ex-girlfriend Becca Edwards arrived with unfinished business, whilst Alice made an unexplained departure from the villa. Jacques Fraser arrives during the sixth episode to patch things with his ex-girlfriend Nicole following rumours that he cheated on her, but he's left sick to his stomach during the seventh episode when the girl he cheated on her with Frankie Isabella arrives on the beach to reveal the whole truth. Zaralena also left the villa during this episode following one too many arguments. Trouble arises when Chanelle McLeary arrives as Josh's ex during the eighth episode, and she's quickly removed from the villa after a violent stand-off with Zahida. Jacques also leaves the villa during this episode when the Tablet of Terror forces Sean into sending somebody home. The penultimate episode featured the arrival of Jenny Thompson, the ex-girlfriend of Josh who turned up to see if he had matured. Maisie's ex-boyfriend Sam Stoddart who arrived on the island. The final episode included the arrival of Taylor Morgan declaring war on her ex-boyfriend Sean.

Bold indicates original cast member; all other cast were brought into the series as an ex.

Duration of cast

Table Key
 Key:  = "Cast member" is featured in this episode
 Key:  = "Cast member" arrives on the beach
 Key:  = "Cast member" has an ex arrive on the beach
 Key:  = "Cast member" arrives on the beach and has an ex arrive during the same episode
 Key:  = "Cast member" leaves the beach
 Key:  = "Cast member" has an ex arrive on the beach and leaves during the same episode
 Key:  = "Cast member" arrives on the beach and leaves during the same episode
 Key:  = "Cast member" does not feature in this episode

Episodes

{| class="wikitable plainrowheaders" style="width:100%"
|- style="color:black"
! style="background:#FAAC58;"| No. inseries
! style="background:#FAAC58;"| No. inseason
! style="background:#FAAC58;"| Title
! style="background:#FAAC58;"| Original air date
! style="background:#FAAC58;"| Duration
! style="background:#FAAC58;"| UK viewers

|}

Ratings

References

External links
Official website

2017 British television seasons
06